The structure for competitive Gaelic football in Tyrone is based on league and championship competitions. Modern tradition strongly links league and championship ranking together; winning a respective championship also gets you promoted in the league regardless of where you finish in the latter, while the league can see your championship status being upgraded or downgraded.

Competitions in Tyrone are organized in the following manner.

Senior 

Regardless of wherever a team plays in the county Senior, Intermediate or Junior football championship, the main or first team in all clubs are regarded as the senior team. There are current 49 teams from 48 clubs competing in this grade (Errigal Ciarán have a third team that competes in Division 3).

In the 2007 season the All-county league (ACL) is split into four divisions of 12 teams each except for Division 3 which has 13 teams. The divisions in ranking order, with the highest one first, are Division 1A, Division 1B, Division 2 and Division 3. Teams that compete in Divisions 1A & 1B compete in the Senior Championship, Division 2 teams compete in the Intermediate Championship and Division 3 teams play for the Junior Championship. Each team plays each other on a double round-robin, giving sides 22 league games or 24 in Division 3.

From 2008 the ACL will be split into three divisions, with the finishing places from the 2007 league determining which of the three divisions each team will play in. Divisions 1 & 2 will each have 16 teams with the remainder in Division 3. The league will be played on a single round basis giving teams 15 games a season.

The Senior, Intermediate and Junior Championships are all played on a straight knockout-basis, usually commencing in May and finishing in September or October.

Reserve 

All clubs, except Errigal Ciaran's third team, have a corresponding reserve team that acts as a second string below their senior team. These teams compete in the same divisions as their senior team, with most matches taking place on the same day before the corresponding senior fixture.

The Reserve Championships take place in a similar fashion to their senior teams, though they are called instead the Division 1, Division 2 and Division 3 Reserve Championships.

There is no promotion or relegation between reserve leagues, it is dependent on how successful their senior team does in the same year. Therefore, unlike their corresponding senior team, it is possible for a reserve team to retain a league or championship title in Divisions 2 or 3, and the league in Division 1B.

Under 21 

The Under 21 Championship commenced in 1975 was for some two and a half decades an open straight knockout competition between all clubs that entered. 2000 saw the introduction of a Grade 2 championship and 2004 seen the introduction of group stages before progressing on to knockout rounds. The competition usually starts in July. However fixture congestion and worries of player burnout at this age level have seen some clubs either not enter at this age level or they withdraw during the competition.

Minor 

Minor competitions are for players under 18 years of age. All competing teams are split into three different grades, usually 16 in grades 1 and 2 with the remainder in grade 3. The terms "grades" for youth football are a term near exclusive to Tyrone, with other counties often using the term "divisions". Also all youth football is played on an All-county basis, and not on a divisional or local basis like some other counties.

In the Minor football leagues, each grade is split into two sections of normally 8 teams. This split in not at random, it is done by geography, with one section comprising the eight more westerly teams in the grade with the other section comprising the eight more easterly teams with rare exceptions. This geographical split does not have a fixed line and depends on the competing teams in each grade. While teams from places like Strabane and Omagh will almost always compete in a section for western-based teams and Cookstown and Coalisland in an eastern section, teams from around the centre of the county could end up in either. Indeed, if a grade has teams which has many more from one part of the county than the other, some teams may end up playing in a section with different teams than usual.  E.G. a grade which has a lot of East Tyrone teams might see clubs like Killeeshil and Pomeroy play in the western section, while a grade with a lot of West Tyrone teams might see Beragh or Fintona play in the eastern section.

In the league each team plays each other once, seven games in total, with the top four in each section going forward to the quarter finals which are then played on a straight knockout basis.

The championship follows the same grades as those of the league and is played on a straight knockout basis. The draw is open with no restrictions on geography. The Minor Grade 1 Football Championship final is traditionally played as a curtain raiser to the Senior Football Championship Final.

Minor competitions usually start in late March, normally with a break in June for exams by which time league games pre-quarter final will normally have been completed.

Games played in Grades 1 and 2 are with 15-a-side teams while those in Grade 3 are played 13-a-side.

Under 16 & Under 14 

Both Under 16 and Under 14 competitions follow the same format, similar to that of minor competitions.

In the league, competitions are split into four grades of normally 12 teams each (before 2005 they were split into three as for minor competitions). Each grade is then split into two sections of six in a similar fashion to that for the minor league. Each team plays each other home and away, giving 10 games and the top four qualify for the league quarter finals. The championships are also run on a straight open knockout basis.

A team winning a league or championship title at under 14 level will be "promoted" while a team that finishes bottom of their section would be "relegated" when it comes to Under 16 competitions in two years time. E.g. a team that wins the under 14 grade 4 championship in 2007 will play in grade 3 at Under 16 level in 2009. The rules for this are not rigid however, and clubs may ask to be placed in a certain grade before they are drawn up for the year. However the final decision lies with the county youth committee whose job it is to ensure that each grade is competitive for all teams involved. Under 16 promotion/relegation can work in a similar fashion for minor football, but is a little more complicated because of the different number of grades.

Games played in Grades 1 & 2 are played 15-a-side while those in Grade 3 & 4 are played 13-a-side. Under 16 competitions are played with a size 5 football while Under 14 games are played with a size 4 football. The Under 14 competitions usually start in March while Under 16 competition starts in late June/early July.

Unlike other counties, Juvenile competitions in Tyrone often refer only to Under 16 competitions and not all levels under minor.

Under 13 

Over the last number of years a small autumn Under 13 based league has taken place in Tyrone. Its original purpose was to find a county winner for the Feile na nÓg competition but has since evolved into its own competition with 4 different grades.

In 2006 Grade 1 was played with teams 15-a-side, Grade 2 13-a-side, while Grades 3 & 4 were played 11 and 9-a-side respectively on shortened playing areas. Only a league takes place, there is no championship competition.

Under 12 

Since the early 1990s Under 12 football has been played on a non-competitive basis, with teams arranged into local groups to play each other in a round-robin. The emphasis is on player and team development rather than winning, and as such no trophies or medals are awarded by the county board. In 2005 the league has been run on the Go-Games principles with rules different from those normally, smaller teams and shortened pitches.

Under 10 and Under 8 

Competitions at these age levels are held as blitzes usually around once a month at each age level. Like Under 12 competitions the Go-Games principles apply for each age level. E.G. Under 8 games are played under "First Touch" rules which doesn't allow for deliberate physical contact and is only allowed to bounce the ball once in a solo run.